Anisa Rola (born 24 May 1994) is a retired Slovenian international football defender.

International goals

Notes

External links 
 
 Profile at LUV Graz

1994 births
Living people
Sportspeople from Maribor
Women's association football defenders
Slovenian women's footballers
Expatriate women's footballers in Austria
Slovenian expatriate sportspeople in Austria
Slovenian expatriate footballers
Slovenia women's international footballers
ÖFB-Frauenliga players
ŽNK MB Tabor players
DFC LUV Graz players